Mars & Mystre, a.k.a. Michael Robbins (Mars) and Eric Newman (Mystre), are one of San Francisco's trance pioneers.

Cybertrance Parties
The original mixtapes of Mars vs. Mystre were released in 1997 and 1998, and from around 1996 to 2000, the pair would throw raves in and around San Francisco. The announcements for these and other rave / underground parties were stored on the SF Raves bulletin board / mailing list maintained by Brian Behlendorf.

Mainstream success
Dedicated to spreading the sound of Cybertrance, Mars opened Frequency 8, America's first record store dedicated to the trance movement. From the success of Frequency 8, Mars would go on to create his own international record label and event organization of the same name.

In 2000 Mars and Mystre released their best selling two CD compilation album "Faith In 2000". The album included fifteen tracks by artists like Art Of Trance, DJ Tandu, and ATB. Mars & Mystre included several tracks that they produced together, such as Electric Blue, Save the Rave, Eye in the Sky, all released on 12 inch vinyl on their record label, Frequency 8. Both also worked with Germany's Nostrum (Bernd Augustinski) on "Eye In The Sky". Mars also collaborated with Nostrum under the alias Red Rock Project on a track called "Mystic Ways ".

Shortly after the release of Faith in 2000 they parted ways and Mars embarked on his solo career. The record store, Frequency 8, located on Haight Street briefly changed to "Reverb Records" and was run by DJ Mystre (Eric Newman) before finally going out of business.

In 2002, before the San Francisco Frequency 8 shut down, Mars opened a frequency 8 location in the Westwood district of Los Angeles near UCLA but the store only stayed in operation for a year or so. There was also a F8 store on Broadway in Seattle's Capitol Hill neighborhood.

Select discography

Albums
 Mars vs. Mystre vol 1 (1997)
 Mars vs. Mystre vol 2 (1998)
 Faith in 2000 
 Alienaided- Mars 
 Sonic Sunrise- Mars

Singles
 Electric Blue (Produced by Oliver Lieb)

References

External links
 Official F8 Website

American DJs
American trance music groups
Electronic dance music DJs